Luan Polli Gomes (born 6 April 1993) is a Brazilian footballer who plays for Coritiba as a goalkeeper.

Club career
Born in Meleiro, Santa Catarina, Luan joined Figueirense's youth setup in 2009, aged 15. On 2 September 2012 he was loaned to Flamengo, until June 2013.

Luan was promoted to the main squad in 2013, and subsequently renewed his loan deal for a further year. He made his senior debut for the club on 16 March 2014, starting in a 2–2 home draw against Bangu.

Luan returned to Figueira in the 2014 summer, and made his first team – and Série A – debut on 10 September, playing the full 90 minutes in a 1–1 home draw against Fluminense.

Honours
 Flamengo
Copa do Brasil: 2013
Campeonato Carioca: 2014

 Atlético Goianiense
Campeonato Goiano: 2022

References

External links

1993 births
Living people
Sportspeople from Santa Catarina (state)
Brazilian footballers
Association football goalkeepers
Campeonato Brasileiro Série A players
Campeonato Brasileiro Série B players
Campeonato Brasileiro Série C players
Figueirense FC players
CR Flamengo footballers
Boa Esporte Clube players
Sport Club do Recife players
Atlético Clube Goianiense players
Fortaleza Esporte Clube players
Coritiba Foot Ball Club players
Maltese Premier League players
Naxxar Lions F.C. players
Brazilian expatriate footballers
Brazilian expatriate sportspeople in Malta
Expatriate footballers in Malta